Ben Abdallah Banda (born August 15, 1971) is a Ghanaian politician and member of the Seventh Parliament of the Fourth Republic of Ghana representing the Offinso South Constituency in the Ashanti Region on the ticket of the New Patriotic Party.

Early life and education 
Banda was born on August 15, 1971. He hails from Abofour-Offinso a town in the Ashanti Region of Ghana. He obtained his bachelor's degree in law from the University of Ghana in 1998. He also earned a bachelor of law degree from Ghana School of Law in 2000.

Personal life 
Banda is Muslim. He is married with three children.

Politics 
Banda is a Ghanaian politician and a member of the Fifth Parliament of the Fourth Republic of Ghana representing the Offinso South Constituency in the Ashanti region of Ghana on the ticket of the New Patriotic Party.

He was the chairperson of the Judiciary Committee. He is also the chairperson of Constitutional, Legal and Parliamentary Affairs Committee. He is also a member of the Subsidiary Legislation Committee.

Employment 
Banda is a lawyer. He is a partner at Obeng Manu Law Firm, Kumasi.

References

Ghanaian MPs 2017–2021
1971 births
Living people
Ghanaian Muslims
New Patriotic Party politicians
University of Ghana alumni
21st-century Ghanaian lawyers